Austin Campbell Pendleton (born March 27, 1940) is an American actor, playwright, theatre director, and instructor.

Pendleton is known as a prolific character actor on the stage and screen, whose six-decade career has included roles in films including Catch-22 (1970); What's Up, Doc? (1972); The Front Page (1974); The Muppet Movie (1979), Short Circuit (1986); Mr. and Mrs. Bridge (1990); My Cousin Vinny (1992); Amistad (1997); A Beautiful Mind (2001), which earned him a Screen Actors Guild Award for Outstanding Performance by a Cast in a Motion Picture nomination; and Finding Nemo (2003).

Pendleton received a Tony Award nomination for Best Direction of a Play for the Broadway revival of The Little Foxes in 1981. He has received two Drama Desk Award nominations and the recipient of a Special Drama Desk Award in 2007. He also received a Obie Award for Best Director for the 2011 off-Broadway revival of Three Sisters. Recent Broadway credits include Choir Boy in 2016 and The Minutes in 2022.

Early life and education
Pendleton was born in Warren, Ohio, the son of Thorn Pendleton, who ran a tool company, and Frances ( Manchester) Pendleton, a professional actress. He graduated from the University School, a private all-boys school in Shaker Heights, Ohio, in 1957. A childhood friend was Roger Ailes, later of Fox News. 

Pendleton became interested in the theater through his mother, whose performances he watched when he was young. In junior high school, he put on his own performances in the basement of the family home. He participated in theater while attending Yale University, from which he graduated in 1961. He was a member of the Yale Dramatic Association, and in 1958 collaborated with lyricist Peter Bergman on two musical plays that starred Philip Proctor: Tom Jones and Booth Is Back In Town. Proctor and Bergman later formed half of The Firesign Theatre comedy group.

Career
After Yale, Pendleton moved to New York City and studied at HB Studio. He broke into the theater performing in the 1962 off-Broadway production of Oh Dad, Poor Dad, Mama's Hung You in the Closet and I'm Feelin' So Sad, directed by Jerome Robbins.

Robbins directed Fiddler on the Roof when it came to Broadway in 1964, and brought Pendleton into the opening-night cast, performing the role of Motel the tailor. Pendleton went on to appear in The Last Sweet Days of Isaac (for which he won the Drama Desk Award for Outstanding Performance and an Obie Award), The Diary of Anne Frank, Goodtime Charley, and Up from Paradise, and many other plays. In August 2006, he played the Chaplain in the New York Shakespeare Festival/Public Theater production of Bertolt Brecht's Mother Courage and Her Children directed by George C. Wolfe at the Delacorte Theater. In 2007, he appeared as Friar Lawrence in the Public Theater's production of Shakespeare's Romeo and Juliet at the Delacorte.

Pendleton wrote the plays Uncle Bob, Booth, and Orson's Shadow, all of which were staged off-Broadway. Uncle Bob had its off-Broadway premiere in 2001 at The SoHo Playhouse, starring George Morfogen—for whom the role of Bob was written—and Joseph Gordon-Levitt, making his New York theatre debut. The critically acclaimed production was directed by Courtney Moorehead and produced by Steven Sendor.

As a director, Pendleton has worked extensively on and off Broadway. His direction of Elizabeth Taylor and Maureen Stapleton in Lillian Hellman's The Little Foxes garnered him a Tony Award nomination in 1981. Additional directing credits include The Runner Stumbles by Milan Stitt (1977), Spoils of War by Michael Weller (1988), and The Size of the World by Charles Evered (1996).

Pendleton is also a member of The Mirror Theater Ltd's Mirror Repertory Company, directing the company's 1984 production of Henrik Ibsen's Ghosts, starring Geraldine Page, Sabra Jones, and Victor Slezak. His play H6R3, a compilation of Henry VI and Richard III intended to make the story line clearer and strengthen the women's parts, became a benefit production of The Mirror Theater Ltd at the then Promenade Theater in New York. Pendleton played Richard in this performance, Sabra Jones performed Elizabeth, Lynn Redgrave played Mad Margaret, Charles McAteer was Lord Rutland, Geraint Wyn Davies played Henry VI, Daniel Gerroll played Buckingham, and Lisa Pelikan played Lady Anne.

In 2009, Pendleton directed Uncle Vanya, starring Maggie Gyllenhaal and Peter Sarsgaard, at the Classic Stage Company. The same year he directed Tennessee Williams's Vieux Carré at The Pearl Theatre Company. In 2010, Pendleton directed two plays, Bus Stop at the Olney Theater and Golden Age at the Philadelphia Theatre Company. His 2011 directing of Three Sisters won him an Obie Award. In 2012, he directed a production of Detroit at the National Theatre in London.

Pendleton served as artistic director of the Circle Repertory Company with associate artistic director Lynne Thigpen. The company closed in 1996. He has taught acting at HB Studio since 1969, and teaches directing at The New School. Pendleton has been involved with Chicago's Steppenwolf Theatre since directing Ralph Pape's Say Goodnight, Gracie for the 1979-80 season, and is an ensemble member there. His acting credits at Steppenwolf include Uncle Vanya, Valparaiso, and Educating Rita.

In 2022, Pendleton reminisced that he was initially reluctant to join Steppenwolf, as the name bothered him and he was reluctant to move to Chicago. "But he ended up taking the gig and started auditioning the troupe—twelve relative unknowns. 'For one role, I had to choose between Laurie Metcalf and Joan Allen,' he said. A second role went to a guy named John Malkovich."

Pendleton was the subject of Starring Austin Pendleton, a 2016 documentary in which colleagues including Meryl Streep, Philip Seymour Hoffman, Maggie Gyllenhaal, Olympia Dukakis, and Ethan Hawke discuss his life and legacy.

As a member of the Steppenwolf Theatre Company, Pendleton starred in Tracy Letts's play The Minutes, which has since transferred to Broadway.

In the fall of 2022, Pendleton directed a Broadway production of Between Riverside and Crazy, which he directed Off Broadway in 2014.

Personal life 
Pendleton has been married to actress Katina Commings since November 1970. They have one child.

Work

Theatre

Filmography

Television

References

External links
 
 
 
 
 Austin Pendleton Talks about Stuttering and Acting
 

1940 births
Living people
American acting coaches
Male actors from Ohio
Male actors from New York City
20th-century American male actors
21st-century American male actors
American male film actors
American male stage actors
American male television actors
American male voice actors
20th-century American dramatists and playwrights
American theatre directors
The New School faculty
People from Warren, Ohio
Yale University alumni
Writers from Ohio
Writers from Manhattan
Steppenwolf Theatre Company players